Map of places in Moray compiled from this list

This List of places in Moray is a list of links for any town, village or hamlet in the Moray council area of Scotland.

 

A
Aberlour, Aberlour Distillery
Alves
Archiestown
Arradoul
Auchenhalrig
Auchindoun, Auchindoun Castle

B
Ballindalloch, Ballindalloch Castle
Balvenie, Balvenie Castle
Baxters Highland Village
Ben Rinnes
Benromach Distillery
Boharm
Bogmoor
Borough Briggs
Bow Fiddle Rock
Broadley
Brodie Castle
Buckie, 
Burghead, Burghead Well

C
Cairngorms National Park
Cardhu Distillery
Clochan
Cragganmore Distillery
Craigellachie
Culbin Sands, Forest and Findhorn Bay
Cullen
Cummingston

D
Dallas, Dallas Dhu Distillery
Deskford
Dipple
Drybridge
Dufftown, Dufftown Distillery
Duffus, Duffus Castle
Dunphail
Dyke

E
Elgin, Elgin Cathedral, Elgin Museum

F
Findhorn
Findochty
Fochabers
Fogwatt
Forres

G
Garmouth
Glen Grant Distillery
Glen Moray Distillery
Glenfarclas Distillery
Glenfiddich Distillery
Glenlivet Distillery

H
Hopeman

I
Ianstown
Inchberry
Inchkeil

K
Keith, Keith and Dufftown Railway, Keith and Dufftown Railway (GNoSR)
Kingston
Kinloss, Kinloss Abbey, Kinloss Barracks
Kintrae
Kirkmichael

L
Lhanbryde
Longmorn
Lossiemouth

M
Macallan
Mill of Tynet
Millbuies
Miltonduff
Moray Firth
Mosstodloch

N
Nelson's Tower
Nether Dallachy
Newmill

O
Ordiguish
Orton

P
Pittendreich
Pluscarden Abbey
Portgordon
Portknockie

R
Raffan
Rafford
River Findhorn
River Spey
Roseisle
Rothes
Rothiemay

S
Spey Bay, Speyside, Speyside Cooperage
Spynie, Spynie Palace
Strathisla, Strathisla Distillery
Sueno's Stone

T
Tomintoul
Tugnet

U
Unthank
Upper Dallachy
Urquhart

See also
List of places in Scotland

Moray
Geography of Moray
Lists of places in Scotland
Populated places in Scotland